Lindside is an unincorporated community in Monroe County, West Virginia, United States. Lindside is located on U.S. Route 219, northeast of Peterstown. Lindside has a post office with ZIP code 24951.

The name Lindside was derived from linden, a type of tree, according to local history.

References

Unincorporated communities in Monroe County, West Virginia
Unincorporated communities in West Virginia